Powellite is a calcium molybdate mineral with formula CaMoO4. Powellite crystallizes with tetragonal - dipyramidal crystal structure as transparent adamantine blue, greenish brown, yellow to grey typically anhedral forms. It exhibits distinct cleavage and has a brittle to conchoidal fracture. It has a Mohs hardness of 3.5 to 4 and a specific gravity of 4.25. It forms a solid solution series with scheelite (calcium tungstate, CaWO4). It has refractive index values of nω=1.974 and nε=1.984.

Powellite was first described by William Harlow Melville in 1891 for an occurrence in the Peacock Mine, Adams County, Idaho and named for American explorer and geologist, John Wesley Powell (1834–1902).

It occurs in hydrothermal ore deposits of molybdenum within the near surface oxidized zones. It also appears as a rare mineral phase in pegmatite, tactite and basalt. Minerals found in association with powellite include molybdenite, ferrimolybdite, stilbite, laumontite and apophyllite.

References

 Palache, C., H. Berman, and C. Frondel (1951) Dana’s System of Mineralogy, (7th edition), v. II, pp. 1079–1081.

External links

Oxide minerals
Molybdate minerals
Tetragonal minerals
Minerals in space group 88
Luminescent minerals